The 1925 Tour of the Basque Country was the second edition of the Tour of the Basque Country cycle race and was held from 6 August to 9 August 1925. The race started and finished in Bilbao. The race was won by Auguste Verdyck.

General classification

References

1925
Bas